Rasoun Village is located in the Ajloun Governorate in northern Jordan. It is known as a beautiful tourist area in Jordan and is characterized by nature scenery.  It is approximately 8 kilometers from Ajloun via a road characterized by green mountains and perennial trees.  The village has received aid through programs initiated by Queen Rania of Jordan.  These programs aimed to improve the village infrastructure and encourage tourism.

History
It had a population of 4 Muslim households and 1 Muslim bachelor, in addition to 5 Christian households. They paid a fixed tax-rate of 25%  on various  agricultural products, including wheat, barley, olive trees, goats and beehives, in addition to  occasional revenues; a total of  1,300 akçe.

In 1838 Rasoun's inhabitants were predominantly Sunni Muslims and Greek Christians.

The Jordanian census of 1961 found 672 inhabitants in Rasoun.

Tourism
Rasoun is surrounded by wooded mountains and caves that provide opportunities for climbing and exploration. The village is situated below the Ajloun Forest Reserve.

Rasoun is also on the Abraham Path, a tourist venture designed to create walking paths following sites important in Christianity.

References

Bibliography

External links
Video of Queen Rania's visit to Rasoun
Blog about Tourism in Rasoun
Queen Rania development project in Rasoun
Abraham Path

Populated places in Ajloun Governorate